Jennifer Claudette Ward (born January 29, 1944) was United States ambassador to Niger from March 25, 1991, to May 28, 1993.

Ward trained as an historian and received her BA degree from Vassar College in 1965 and her MA and PhD from the University of California, Los Angeles.

After 20 years in the Foreign Service left to become Associate dean at the Georgetown School of Foreign Service in 1999, returning to her academic roots (Ward taught at Medgar Evers College in Brooklyn and was an administrator at Princeton).

References

External links 

1944 births
Living people
Vassar College alumni
University of California, Los Angeles alumni
Medgar Evers College faculty
Ambassadors of the United States to Niger
American women ambassadors
Princeton University staff
Georgetown University staff
21st-century American women
Women heads of universities and colleges